Piecuch is a Polish surname. Notable people with the surname include:

Piotr Piecuch (born 1960), Polish-born American physical chemist

Polish-language surnames